Breynia desorii is a species of sea urchins of the Family Loveniidae. Their armour is covered with spines. Breynia desorii was first scientifically described in 1851 by Gray.

References

Animals described in 1851
Spatangoida